Final Articles Revision Convention, 1946 is  an International Labour Organization Convention.

It was established in 1946 with the preamble stating:
Having decided upon the adoption of certain proposals with regard to the partial revision of the Conventions adopted by the Conference at its first twenty-eight sessions for the purpose of making provision for the future discharge of certain chancery functions entrusted by the said Conventions to the Secretary-General of the League of Nations and introducing therein certain further amendments consequential upon the dissolution of the League of Nations and the amendment of the Constitution of the International Labour Organisation,...

Ratifications
As of 2013, the convention has been ratified by 57 states.

External links 
Text.
Ratifications.

International Labour Organization conventions
Treaties concluded in 1946
Treaties entered into force in 1947
Treaties of Algeria
Treaties of Argentina
Treaties of Australia
Treaties of Austria
Treaties of Bangladesh
Treaties of Belgium
Treaties of Bosnia and Herzegovina
Treaties of the Second Brazilian Republic
Treaties of the People's Republic of Bulgaria
Treaties of Canada
Treaties of Chile
Treaties of the Republic of China (1912–1949)
Treaties of Colombia
Treaties of Cuba
Treaties of Czechoslovakia
Treaties of the Czech Republic
Treaties of Denmark
Treaties of the Dominican Republic
Treaties of the Kingdom of Egypt
Treaties of the Ethiopian Empire
Treaties of Finland
Treaties of the French Fourth Republic
Treaties of the Kingdom of Greece
Treaties of Guatemala
Treaties of the Dominion of India
Treaties of the Kingdom of Iraq
Treaties of Ireland
Treaties of Italy
Treaties of Japan
Treaties of Lithuania
Treaties of Luxembourg
Treaties of Mexico
Treaties of Montenegro
Treaties of Morocco
Treaties of the Netherlands
Treaties of New Zealand
Treaties of Norway
Treaties of the Dominion of Pakistan
Treaties of Panama
Treaties of Peru
Treaties of the Polish People's Republic
Treaties of Serbia and Montenegro
Treaties of Slovakia
Treaties of Slovenia
Treaties of the Union of South Africa
Treaties of Francoist Spain
Treaties of the Dominion of Ceylon
Treaties of Sweden
Treaties of Switzerland
Treaties of the United Arab Republic
Treaties of Thailand
Treaties of North Macedonia
Treaties of Turkey
Treaties of the United Kingdom
Treaties of the United States
Treaties of Uruguay
Treaties of Venezuela
Treaties of Vietnam
Treaties of Yugoslavia
1946 in labor relations